Kseniya (or Ksenia or Xenia) Boguslavskaya (24 January 1892 – 3 May 1972) was a Russian avant-garde artist (Futurist, Suprematist), poet and interior decorator. Her husband Ivan Puni was also a painter. She seems to be the originator of the Mavva (symbol of the World Evil) featured in poems written by Velimir Khlebnikov.

Career
Born in St. Petersburg,  she studied art in Paris from 1911 to 1913.  She returned to St. Petersburg in 1913 and married Ivan Puni.  Their apartment in St Petersburg became a meeting place for avant-garde artists and poets.  With Puni she published the cubo-futurist booklet Roaring Parnassus («Рыкающий Парнас») in 1914.

During the year 1915, Boguslavskaya joined the Supremus («Супремус»), a group of avant-garde artists. Some group members included  (Liubov Popova, Nadezhda Udaltsova,  Varvara Stepanova, Aleksandra Ekster, Ivan Kliun, Nina Genke-Meller, Ivan Puni  and others. The group was led by the founder of Suprematism, Kazimir Malevich.

In 1915–1916 with other Suprematist artists, she worked in the Verbovka Village Folk Centre in the Ukrainian province near Kiev. She exhibited at the first Futurist exhibition in 1915, and helped organize the Suprematist 0.10 Exhibition in late 1915. She was also a member of Jack of Diamonds (1919)  and Mir iskusstva (1916–1918).

Berlin Period
In 1919 she and Puni escaped from the Soviet Union across the ice of the Gulf of Finland. She lived in Berlin from 1919 to 1923, working as a scene designer for the Russian-German cabaret called Der Blaue Vogel and for the Russian Romantic Theatre.  In Berlin, she established ties with the International Futurists, including poet Ruggero Vasari and Kārlis Zāle.

Paris Period
After 1923 she lived with her husband in Paris.  Her husband died in Paris in 1956; she donated 12 paintings by Puni to the Musée National d'Art Moderne in Paris in 1959 and donated some of his engravings and other papers to the National Library of France in 1966. She exhibited at the Salon des Indépendants in 1966 and helped organize an exhibition of Puni's works at the Musée de l'Orangerie the same years.

She died in Montparnasse, Paris in 1972.

References

1892 births
1972 deaths
20th-century Russian painters
Russian avant-garde
Russian designers
Suprematism (art movement)
20th-century Russian women artists
Emigrants from the Russian Empire to Germany
Emigrants from the Russian Empire to France
White Russian emigrants to France
White Russian emigrants to Germany
Russian women painters